Kayenze is an administrative ward in Ilemela District, Mwanza Region, Tanzania. In 2016 the Tanzania National Bureau of Statistics report there were 10,035 people in the ward.

Villages 
The ward has 15 villages.

 Igombe A
 Bugogwa
 Lugezi
 Kabangaja
 Kasamwa
 Igombe B
 Kigote
 Kilabela
 Bujimwa
 Kayenze Ndogo
 Kisundi
 Isanzu
 Igogwe
 Nkoroto
 Kilimanilwe Mtemi

References

Wards of Mwanza Region
Ilemela District
Constituencies of Tanzania